Doddabetta is the highest mountain in the Nilgiri Mountains at 2,637 metres (8,652 feet). There is a reserved forest area around the peak. It is 9 km from Ooty, on the Ooty-Kotagiri Road in the Nilgiris District of Tamil Nadu, India. It is a popular tourist attraction with road access to the summit. It is the fourth highest peak in South India next to Anamudi, Mannamalai and Meesapulimala. The peaks Hecuba (2375 m), Kattadadu (2418 m) and Kulkudi (2439 m) are the three closely linked summits in the west of the Doddabetta range near to Udagamandalam.

Flora
The area surrounding Doddabetta is mostly forested. Sholas cover the hollows of its slopes. Slightly stunted, rhododendron trees, in the midst of thick coarse grass, flowering sub-alpine shrubs and herbs are common, even very near the peak.

Telescope House

There is an observatory at the top of Doddabetta with two telescopes available for the public. It was opened on 18 June 1983 and is run by the Tamil Nadu Tourism Development Corporation (TTDC). The average number of viewers in 2001-2002 was 3500 per day in season and 700 per day in the off season.

References

External links
 Doddabetta Peak
 "Doda Betta, India" on Peakbagger

Mountains of the Western Ghats
Mountains of Tamil Nadu
Two-thousanders of Asia
Highest points of Indian states and union territories
Geography of Ooty
Tourist attractions in Nilgiris district
Tourist attractions in Ooty